The Piyale Pasha Mosque, also known as the Tersane Mosque (literally: Shipyard Mosque),  is a 16th-century Ottoman mosque located in the Kasımpaşa neighborhood of the Beyoğlu district in Istanbul, Turkey.

History 
The Piyale Pasha Mosque was designed by Ottoman imperial architect Mimar Sinan for the vizier and grand admiral Piyale Mehmed Pasha. The mosque was built between 1565 and 1573.

Architecture 

It is one of only two mosques in Istanbul with multiple domes, the other being Vasat Atik Ali Pasha Mosque. The domes are supported in the center of the prayer hall by a pair of slender granite pillars. The minaret is placed in the centre of the anti-qibla wall. It was rebuilt in the middle of the 19th century. Around three walls of the interior are a row of Iznik tiles with inscriptions in a white thuluth script on a cobalt-blue background. The interior walls are now whitewashed but they were originally decorated. The stained-glass in the windows of the qibla wall is not original.

The domed octagonal mausoleum to the northwest of the mosque contains the tomb of Piyale Pasha together with those of his sons and daughters. Altogether there are thirteen sarcophagi. His wife, Gevherhan Sultan (daughter of Selim II), remarried and is entombed in Selim II's mausoleum next to Hagia Sophia.

A number of identical Iznik tiled lunette panels that are now on display in the Musée du Louvre in Paris, the Museu Calouste Gulbenkian in Lisbon and the Victoria and Albert Museum in London are believed to have been removed from the Piyale Pasha Mosque in the 19th century. The panels would have been placed above the lower row of windows. Another possibility is that the lunette tiles came from a now demolished kiosk that was associated with the mosque. Two tiles from another lunette panel and a pair of tiles that probably came from the mihrab were sold at auction by Christie's in 2004.

Gallery

See also
 List of Friday mosques designed by Mimar Sinan

Notes

References

Sources

External links 

 Piyale Pasa Mosque, Archnet.
 Photographs of the mosque taken by Dick Osseman

Mimar Sinan buildings
Ottoman mosques in Istanbul
Religious buildings and structures completed in 1573
Buildings and structures in Beyoğlu
1573 establishments in the Ottoman Empire
16th-century mosques